In relation to motorsport, Group T2 is a set of technical specifications for series production cross-country cars used in off-road Cross-Country Rallying (also called Rally Raid). The group is governed by the Fédération Internationale de l'Automobile (FIA) and defined in appendix J, article 284 of its International Sporting Code. The cars must use a bodyshell and apart from safety features such as a roll cage and upgraded suspension and wheels, must retain features of the series production car unlike the thoroughbred race prototypes in Group T1, which have more freedom surrounding the chassis build and other parts. The cars in T2 must be homologated with a series production build requirement of 1000 identical units.

History 
Group T2 was first introduced in 1990 when the generic Group T, introduced the year before, was divided into four specific categories. Until 2002, FIA's T2 was for improved series production cross-country cars, with Group T1 being reserved for normal series production cars. In 2003 for one year only, T2 became modified cross-country cars with no production requirement and being placed in Category II for competition cars. However the following year they were moved back to Category I production cars, essentially swapping to the modern arrangement, with T1 for modified competition cars and T2 for series production cars.. These cars have been competing in Baja Cross Country Rallies, Rally Raids and Marathon Rallies since their inception, including in the FIA World Cup for Cross Country Rallies.

Classes 
There are no additional classes when competing in the FIA World Rally-Raid Championship, which includes the long established Dakar Rally in its inaugural season. Prior, T2 cars complying with the Dakar Rally's organiser ASO's rules were permitted in FIA events and cups.

Cars 
Homologated cars as of 2023 include:

See also
Cross-Country Cars
 Group T1 - prototype
 Group T2 - series production
Lightweight Cross-Country Vehicles
 Group T3 - prototype
 Group T4 - series production side-by-side vehicles
Cross-Country Trucks
 Group T5 - prototype and series production

References

External links 
 FIA World Rally Raid Championship
 FIA Cross Country Rallies Regulations

Dakar Rally
Off-road racing
Pre-Cross Country Rally World Cup races
Fédération Internationale de l'Automobile
Racing car classes
Rally raids